The Kildonan North Stars were a Canadian Junior ice hockey Team in the Manitoba Junior Hockey League from Winnipeg, Manitoba.

History

During the summer of 1967, community-minded sports group purchased the Winnipeg Warriors from Ben Hatskin, renaming them the West Kildonan North Stars.  The team was located in Northwest Winnipeg.

In 1967-68 Centre Wayne Chernecki led the MJHL in both points and goals, and was also voted Rookie of the Year, and earned First Team All-Star honors.

For the 1976-77 season the Team’s name was shorted to the Kildonan North Stars.

In 1978, the Kildonan North Stars captured the Turnbull Cup as Manitoba Junior "A" Hockey Champions.

During the 1986-87 season, the North Stars became infamous for a completely winless 48-game season.  During the stretch from the beginning of the 1985-86 season to the end of the 1986-87 season, the North Stars had 6 wins, 90 losses, and no ties.  Over the two Seasons the Kildonan North Stars would set a record for the all time losing streak, 64 games without a point, passing the Regina Silver Foxes record of 58 losses from their 1975 season. Three years later the team was dissolved despite two consecutive winning seasons.

Season-by-season record
Note: GP = Games Played, W = Wins, L = Losses, T = Ties, OTL = Overtime Losses, GF = Goals for, GA = Goals against

Playoffs
1971 Lost Quarter-final
St. Boniface Saints defeated West Kildonan North Stars 4-games-to-3
1972 Lost Final
West Kildonan North Stars defeated St. Boniface Saints 4-games-to-1
West Kildonan North Stars defeated St. James Canadians 4-games-to-1
Dauphin Kings defeated West Kildonan North Stars 4-games-to-none
1973 Lost Quarter-final
St. Boniface Saints defeated West Kildonan North Stars 9-points-to-7
1974 Lost Final
West Kildonan North Stars defeated St. Boniface Saints 4-games-to-none
Selkirk Steelers defeated West Kildonan North Stars 4-games-to-1
1975 Lost Final
West Kildonan North Stars defeated St. James Canadians 4-games-to-2
Selkirk Steelers defeated West Kildonan North Stars 4-games-to-3
1976 Lost Final
West Kildonan North Stars defeated Assiniboine Park Monarchs 4-games-to-1
West Kildonan North Stars defeated St. James Canadians 4-games-to-3
Selkirk Steelers defeated West Kildonan North Stars 4-games-to-none
1977 Lost Final
Kildonan North Stars defeated St. James Canadians 4-games-to-1
Kildonan North Stars defeated Kenora Thistles 4-games-to-3
Dauphin Kings defeated Kildonan North Stars 2-games-to-1 (Series suspended, awarded to Dauphin)
1978 Won League, Lost Anavet Cup
Kildonan North Stars defeated St. Boniface Saints 4-games-to-1
Kildonan North Stars defeated Kenora Thistles 4-games-to-2
Kildonan North Stars defeated Dauphin Kings 4-games-to-3 MJHL CHAMPIONS
Prince Albert Raiders (SJHL) defeated Kildonan North Stars 4-games-to-none
1979 Lost Final
Kildonan North Stars defeated Kenora Thistles 4-games-to-3
Kildonan North Stars defeated St. Boniface Saints 4-games-to-none
Selkirk Steelers defeated Kildonan North Stars 4-games-to-2
1980 Lost Final
Kildonan North Stars defeated St. Boniface Saints 4-games-to-2
Kildonan North Stars defeated St. James Canadians 4-games-to-2
Selkirk Steelers defeated Kildonan North Stars 4-games-to-none
1981 Lost Quarter-final
Selkirk Steelers defeated Kildonan North Stars 4-games-to-none
1982 DNQ
1983 Lost Quarter-final
St. Boniface Saints defeated Kildonan North Stars 4-games-to-none
1984 Lost Final
Kildonan North Stars defeated St. Boniface Saints 4-games-to-none
Kildonan North Stars defeated Fort Garry Blues 4-games-to-2
Selkirk Steelers defeated Kildonan North Stars 4-games-to-1
1985 Lost Quarter-final
Winnipeg South Blues defeated Kildonan North Stars 4-games-to-none
1986 DNQ
1987 DNQ
1988 Lost Quarter-final
Winnipeg South Blues defeated Kildonan North Stars 4-games-to-none
1989 Lost Semi-final
Kildonan North Stars defeated St. Boniface Saints 4-games-to-none
Winnipeg South Blues defeated Kildonan North Stars 4-games-to-none
1990 Lost Final
Kildonan North Stars defeated Southeast Thunderbirds 4-games-to-none
Kildonan North Stars defeated St. James Canadians 4-games-to-3
Portage Terriers defeated Kildonan North Stars 4-games-to-none

References
Manitoba Junior Hockey League
Manitoba Hockey Hall of Fame
Hockey Hall of Fame
Winnipeg Free Press Archives

Defunct Manitoba Junior Hockey League teams
Ice hockey teams in Winnipeg
1936 establishments in Manitoba
1990 disestablishments in Manitoba
Ice hockey clubs established in 1936
Sports clubs disestablished in 1990